Peter Haggett  (born 24 January 1933) is a British geographer and academic, Professor Emeritus and Senior Research Fellow in Urban and Regional Geography at the School of Geographical Sciences, University of Bristol.

Haggett was born 1933 in the rural Somerset village of Pawlett, and he was educated at Dr Morgan's Grammar School in Bridgwater. He would later credit the time spent in his childhood walking and cycling around the district for the development of his keen interest in geography.

In 1951 he entered undergraduate studies at St. Catharine's College, Cambridge, where he read Geography. Peter Hall (later Sir Peter), the noted urban geographer, was one of his contemporaries. Haggett graduated in 1954, obtaining a "Double First" (First-Class Honours in parts I and II of the Tripos).

In an academic career spanning half a century, Professor Haggett is noted for his significant research contributions to the field of human geography, and is the author or editor of over 30 books on geographical practice, theory and individual research topics. He has held numerous teaching posts and visiting professorships at institutions around the world, but is most particularly associated with the University of Bristol where he has been a lecturer and professor of geography since 1966. Among the many awards and distinguished recognitions conferred, Haggett was awarded the French Lauréat Prix International de Géographie Vautrin Lud in 1991, and made a Commander of the Order of the British Empire in the Queen's Birthday Honours of 1993, for "services to urban and regional geography".

Peter is also known to have been offered many prestigious academic positions, but has preferred to specialize in the geographical study of epidemiology and the spatial relationships and distribution of infectious diseases for the latter half of his career.

Notes

References

External links
 
 'Emeritus Professor Peter Haggett' personal profile, School of Geographical Sciences–University of Bristol

1933 births
Living people
English geographers
Regional scientists
Academics of the University of Bristol
Alumni of St Catharine's College, Cambridge
Fellows of Fitzwilliam College, Cambridge
Commanders of the Order of the British Empire
Fellows of the British Academy
Members of Academia Europaea
Foreign associates of the National Academy of Sciences
Recipients of the Cullum Geographical Medal
Recipients of the Vautrin Lud International Geography Prize
People from Sedgemoor (district)